The  was a professional wrestling championship owned by the Wrestle-1 (W-1) promotion. The title is meant for the promotion's younger wrestlers.

Like most professional wrestling championships, the title is won as a result of a scripted match. There have been seven reigns shared among six wrestlers.

History
On January 8, 2017, Wrestle-1 announced the creation of the Wrestle-1 Result Championship, meant for the promotion's younger generation of wrestlers, which includes wrestlers from its sub-promotion Pro Wrestling ACE.

Championship tournament
A tournament to crown the inaugural Wrestle-1 Result Champion took place between January 15 and February 22, 2017. The tournament was mainly made up of Wrestle-1 and ACE wrestlers, but also included Ehime Puroresu representative Masayuki Mitomi.

Title history

Combined reigns

See also
List of National Wrestling Alliance championships
IWGP Intercontinental Championship
PWF World Asia Heavyweight Championship
PWF Gaora Television Heavyweight Championship
GHC National Championship

References

External links
Official title history at W-1.co.jp 

Wrestle-1 championships
Openweight wrestling championships